FC Giffarna is a Swedish football club located in Sölvesborg.

Background
FC Giffarna currently plays in Division 4 Blekinge which is the sixth tier of  Swedish football.   They play their home matches at the Svarta Led in Sölvesborg. 

The club is affiliated to Blekinge Fotbollförbund.

Season to season

Footnotes

External links
 FC Giffarna – Official website

Football clubs in Blekinge County

sv:FC Giffarna